Carlos Emilio Morales (November 6, 1939 – November 11, 2014) was a Cuban jazz guitarist.

Selected discography
Irakere (1979)
Havana Jam (1979)
The Legendary Irakere in London (1987)
Homenaje a Beny Moré (1989)
Misa Negra (1992)
Bebo Rides Again (1994)
Cuba Jazz (1996)
Night at Ronnie Scott's, Vol. 4 (1996)
United Nations of Messidor (1996)
Nu Yorica 2!: Further Adventures in Latin Music Chang (1998)
Babalu Ayé (1999)
Afro Cuban Jazz Now (2001)
Afro Cuban Trombone (2003)
Lost Sessions (2003)
Arturo Sandoval & The Latin Jazz Orchestra (2007)
Tata Güines (2007)
Irakere 1978 World Tour (2008)
Chucho Valdés and his Combo (2008)
Fania All-Stars Havana Jam 2 (2009)
Orquesta Cubana de Música Moderna (2009)

References

Further reading
Cuba: A Global Studies Handbook – Ted A. Henken Ph.D. Publisher: ABC-CLIO, 2007. Format: Hardcover, 578pp. Language: English.  
Cuban Music from A to Z – Helio Orovio. Publisher: Duke University Press, 2004. Format: Paperback, 248pp. Language: English. 
 My Sax Life: A Memoir – Paquito D'Rivera, Ilan Stavans. Publisher: Northwestern University Press, 2005. Format: Hardcover, 344pp. Language: English. 
Now in Marianao: an interview with Carlos Emilio Morales – Latin Beat Magazine, October 1998, by Luis Tamargo

External links
AllMusic.com credits 
Irakere biography at AllMusic.com

1939 births
2014 deaths
Cuban guitarists
Latin jazz guitarists
Cuban male guitarists
Male jazz musicians
Irakere members